A telephone is a telecommunications device that permits two or more users to conduct a conversation when they are too far apart to be easily heard directly. A telephone converts sound, typically and most efficiently the human voice, into electronic signals that are transmitted via cables and other communication channels to another telephone which reproduces the sound to the receiving user. A common short form of the term is phone, which came into use early in the telephone's history.

In 1876, Alexander Graham Bell was the first to be granted a United States patent for a device that produced clearly intelligible replication of the human voice at a second device. This instrument was further developed by many others, and became rapidly indispensable in business, government, and in households.

The essential elements of a telephone are a microphone (transmitter) to speak into and an earphone (receiver) which reproduces the voice at a distant location. The receiver and transmitter are usually built into a handset which is held up to the ear and mouth during conversation. The transmitter converts the sound waves to electrical signals which are sent through  the telecommunication system to the receiving telephone, which converts the signals into audible sound in the receiver or sometimes a loudspeaker. Telephones permit transmission in both directions simultaneously.

Most telephones also contain an alerting feature, such as a ringer or a visual indicator, to announce an incoming telephone call. Telephone calls are initiated most commonly with a keypad or dial, affixed to the telephone, to enter a telephone number, which is the address of the call recipient's telephone in the telecommunication system, but other methods existed in the early history of the telephone.

The first telephones were directly connected to each other from one customer's office or residence to another customer's location. Being impractical beyond just a few customers, these systems were quickly replaced by manually operated centrally located switchboards. These exchanges were soon connected together, eventually forming an automated, worldwide public switched telephone network. For greater mobility, various radio systems were developed for transmission between mobile stations on ships and automobiles in the mid-20th century. Hand-held mobile phones were introduced for personal service starting in 1973. In later decades, their analog cellular system evolved into digital networks with greater capability and lower cost.

Convergence in communication services has provided a broad spectrum of capabilities in cell phones, including mobile computing, giving rise to the smartphone, the dominant type of telephone in the world today.

Early history 

Before the development of the electric telephone, the term telephone was applied to other inventions, and not all early researchers of the electrical device used the term. Huth proposed an alternative to the optical telegraph of Claude Chappe in which the operators in the signaling towers would shout to each other by means of what he called "speaking tubes", but would now be called giant megaphones. A communication device for sailing vessels, called telephone, was invented by Captain John Taylor in 1844. This instrument used four air horns to communicate with vessels in foggy weather.

Johann Philipp Reis used the term in reference to his invention, commonly known as the Reis telephone, in c. 1860. His device appears to be the first device based on the conversion of sound into electrical impulses.

The term telephone was adopted into the vocabulary of many languages.

Credit for the invention of the electric telephone is frequently disputed. As with other influential inventions such as radio, television, the light bulb, and the computer, several inventors pioneered experimental work on voice transmission over a wire and improved on each other's ideas. New controversies over the issue still arise from time to time. Charles Bourseul, Antonio Meucci, Johann Philipp Reis, Alexander Graham Bell, and Elisha Gray, amongst others, have all been credited with the invention of the telephone.

Alexander Graham Bell was the first to be awarded a patent for the electric telephone by the United States Patent and Trademark Office (USPTO) in March 1876. Before Bell's patent, the telephone transmitted sound in a way that was similar to the telegraph. This method used vibrations and circuits to send electrical pulses, but was missing key features. Bell found that this method produced a sound through intermittent currents, but in order for the telephone to work a fluctuating current reproduced sounds the best. The fluctuating currents became the basis for the working telephone, creating Bell's patent. That first patent by Bell was the master patent of the telephone, from which other patents for electric telephone devices and features flowed.

In 1876, shortly after Bell's patent application, Hungarian engineer Tivadar Puskás proposed the telephone switch, which allowed for the formation of telephone exchanges, and eventually networks.

In the United Kingdom, the blower is used as a slang term for a telephone. The term came from navy slang for a speaking tube. In the U.S., a somewhat dated slang term refers to the telephone as "the horn," as in "I couldn't get him on the horn," or "I'll be off the horn in a moment."

Timeline of early development

 

 1844: Innocenzo Manzetti first mooted the idea of a "speaking telegraph" or telephone. Use of the "speaking telegraph" and "sound telegraph" monikers would eventually be replaced by the newer, distinct name, "telephone".
 26 August 1854: Charles Bourseul published an article in the magazine L'Illustration (Paris): "Transmission électrique de la parole" (electric transmission of speech), describing a "make-and-break" type telephone transmitter later created by Johann Reis.
 26 October 1861: Johann Philipp Reis (1834–1874) publicly demonstrated the Reis telephone before the Physical Society of Frankfurt. Reis's telephone was not limited to musical sounds. Reis also used his telephone to transmit the phrase "Das Pferd frisst keinen Gurkensalat" ("The horse does not eat cucumber salad").
 22 August 1865, La Feuille d'Aoste reported "It is rumored that English technicians to whom Manzetti illustrated his method for transmitting spoken words on the telegraph wire intend to apply said invention in England on several private telegraph lines". However, telephones would not be demonstrated there until 1876, with a set of telephones from Bell.
 28 December 1871: Antonio Meucci files patent caveat No. 3335 in the U.S. Patent Office, titled "Sound Telegraph", describing communication of voice between two people by wire. A patent caveat was not an invention patent award, but only an unverified notice filed by an individual that he or she intends to file a patent application in the future.
 1874: Meucci, after having renewed the caveat for two years does not renew it again, and the caveat lapses.
 6 April 1875: Bell's U.S. Patent 161,739 "Transmitters and Receivers for Electric Telegraphs" is granted. This uses multiple vibrating steel reeds in make-break circuits.
 11 February 1876: Elisha Gray invents a liquid transmitter for use with the telephone but does not build one.
 14 February 1876: Gray files a patent caveat for transmitting the human voice through a telegraphic circuit.
 14 February 1876: Alexander Graham Bell applies for the patent "Improvements in Telegraphy", for electromagnetic telephones using what is now called amplitude modulation (oscillating current and voltage) but which he referred to as "undulating current".
 19 February 1876: Gray is notified by the U.S. Patent Office of an interference between his caveat and Bell's patent application. Gray decides to abandon his caveat.
 7 March 1876: Bell's U.S. patent 174,465 "Improvement in Telegraphy" is granted, covering "the method of, and apparatus for, transmitting vocal or other sounds telegraphically…by causing electrical undulations, similar in form to the vibrations of the air accompanying the said vocal or other sound."
 10 March 1876: The first successful telephone transmission of clear speech using a liquid transmitter when Bell spoke into his device, "Mr. Watson, come here, I want to see you." and Watson heard each word distinctly.
 30 January 1877: Bell's U.S. patent 186,787 is granted for an electromagnetic telephone using permanent magnets, iron diaphragms, and a call bell.
 27 April 1877: Thomas Edison files a patent application for a carbon (graphite) transmitter. It was published as No. 474,230 on 3 May 1892, after a 15-year delay because of litigation. Edison was granted patent 222,390 for a carbon granules transmitter in 1879.

Early commercial instruments
Early telephones were technically diverse. Some used a water microphone, some had a metal diaphragm that induced current in an electromagnet wound around a permanent magnet, and some were dynamic – their diaphragm vibrated a coil of wire in the field of a permanent magnet or the coil vibrated the diaphragm. The sound-powered dynamic variants survived in small numbers through the 20th century in military and maritime applications, where its ability to create its own electrical power was crucial. Most, however, used the Edison/Berliner carbon transmitter, which was much louder than the other kinds, even though it required an induction coil which was an impedance matching transformer to make it compatible with the impedance of the line. The Edison patents kept the Bell monopoly viable into the 20th century, by which time the network was more important than the instrument.

Early telephones were locally powered, using either a dynamic transmitter or by the powering of a transmitter with a local battery. One of the jobs of outside plant personnel was to visit each telephone periodically to inspect the battery. During the 20th century, telephones powered from the telephone exchange over the same wires that carried the voice signals became common.

Early telephones used a single wire for the subscriber's line, with ground return used to complete the circuit (as used in telegraphs). The earliest dynamic telephones also had only one port opening for sound, with the user alternately listening and speaking (or rather, shouting) into the same hole. Sometimes the instruments were operated in pairs at each end, making conversation more convenient but also more expensive.

At first, the benefits of a telephone exchange were not exploited. Instead, telephones were leased in pairs to a subscriber, who had to arrange for a telegraph contractor to construct a line between them, for example, between a home and a shop. Users who wanted the ability to speak to several different locations would need to obtain and set up three or four pairs of telephones. Western Union, already using telegraph exchanges, quickly extended the principle to its telephones in New York City and San Francisco, and Bell was not slow in appreciating the potential.

Signalling began in an appropriately primitive manner. The user alerted the other end, or the exchange operator, by whistling into the transmitter. Exchange operation soon resulted in telephones being equipped with a bell in a ringer box, first operated over a second wire, and later over the same wire, but with a condenser (capacitor) in series with the bell coil to allow the AC ringer signal through while still blocking DC (keeping the phone "on hook"). Telephones connected to the earliest Strowger switch automatic exchanges had seven wires, one for the knife switch, one for each telegraph key, one for the bell, one for the push-button and two for speaking. Large wall telephones in the early 20th century usually incorporated the bell, and separate bell boxes for desk phones dwindled away in the middle of the century.

Rural and other telephones that were not on a common battery exchange had a magneto hand-cranked generator to produce a high voltage alternating signal to ring the bells of other telephones on the line and to alert the operator. Some local farming communities that were not connected to the main networks set up barbed wire telephone lines that exploited the existing system of field fences to transmit the signal.

In the 1890s a new smaller style of telephone was introduced, packaged in three parts. The transmitter stood on a stand, known as a "candlestick" for its shape. When not in use, the receiver hung on a hook with a switch in it, known as a "switchhook". Previous telephones required the user to operate a separate switch to connect either the voice or the bell. With the new kind, the user was less likely to leave the phone "off the hook". In phones connected to magneto exchanges, the bell, induction coil, battery and magneto were in a separate bell box or "ringer box". In phones connected to common battery exchanges, the ringer box was installed under a desk, or other out-of-the-way place, since it did not need a battery or magneto.

Cradle designs were also used at this time, having a handle with the receiver and transmitter attached, now called a handset, separate from the cradle base that housed the magneto crank and other parts. They were larger than the "candlestick" and more popular.

Disadvantages of single-wire operation such as crosstalk and hum from nearby AC power wires had already led to the use of twisted pairs and, for long-distance telephones, four-wire circuits. Users at the beginning of the 20th century did not place long-distance calls from their own telephones but made an appointment and were connected with the assistance of a telephone operator.

What turned out to be the most popular and longest-lasting physical style of telephone was introduced in the early 20th century, including Bell's 202-type desk set. A carbon granule transmitter and electromagnetic receiver were united in a single molded plastic handle, which when not in use was secured in a cradle in the base unit. The circuit diagram of the model 202 shows the direct connection of the transmitter to the line, while the receiver was inductively coupled. In local battery configurations, when the local loop was too long to provide sufficient current from the exchange, the transmitter was powered by a local battery and inductively coupled, while the receiver was included in the local loop. The coupling transformer and the ringer were mounted in a separate enclosure, called the subscriber set. The dial switch in the base interrupted the line current by repeatedly but very briefly disconnecting the line one to ten times for each digit, and the hook switch (in the center of the circuit diagram) disconnected the line and the transmitter battery while the handset was on the cradle.

In the 1930s, telephone sets were developed that combined the bell and induction coil with the desk set, obviating a separate ringer box. The rotary dial becoming commonplace in the 1930s in many areas enabled customer-dialed service, but some magneto systems remained even into the 1960s. After World War II, the telephone networks saw rapid expansion and more efficient telephone sets, such as the model 500 telephone in the United States, were developed that permitted larger local networks centered around central offices. A breakthrough new technology was the introduction of Touch-Tone signaling using push-button telephones by American Telephone & Telegraph Company (AT&T) in 1963.

Digital telephones and voice over IP 

The invention of the transistor in 1947 dramatically changed the technology used in telephone systems and in the long-distance transmission networks, over the next several decades. With the development of stored program control and MOS integrated circuits for electronic switching systems, and new transmission technologies such as pulse-code modulation (PCM), telephony gradually evolved towards digital telephony, which improved the capacity, quality, and cost of the network.

Integrated Services Digital Network (ISDN) was launched in the 1980's, providing businesses and consumers with access to digital telephony services such as data, voice, video, and fax services. 

The development of digital data communications methods made it possible to digitize voice and transmit it as real-time data across computer networks and the Internet, giving rise to the field of Internet Protocol (IP) telephony, also known as voice over Internet Protocol (VoIP). VoIP has proven to be a disruptive technology that is rapidly replacing traditional telephone network infrastructure.

By January 2005, up to 10% of telephone subscribers in Japan and South Korea had switched to this digital telephone service. A January 2005 Newsweek article suggested that Internet telephony may be "the next big thing." The technology has spawned a new industry comprising many VoIP companies that offer services to consumers and businesses. The reported global VoIP market in October 2021 was $85.2 billion with a projection of $102.5 billion by 2026.

IP telephony uses high-bandwidth Internet connections and specialized customer premises equipment to transmit telephone calls via the Internet, or any modern private data network. The customer equipment may be an analog telephone adapter (ATA) which translates the signals of a conventional analog telephone; an IP Phone, a dedicated standalone device; or a computer softphone application, utilizing the microphone and headset devices of a personal computer or smartphone.

While traditional analog telephones are typically powered from the central office through the telephone line, digital telephones require a local power supply. Internet-based digital service also requires special provisions to provide the service location to the emergency services when an emergency telephone number is called.

Cordless telephones

A cordless telephone or portable telephone consists of a base station unit and one or more portable cordless handsets. The base station connects to a telephone line, or provides service by voice over IP (VOIP). The handset communicates with the base station via radio frequency signals. A handset's operational range is limited, usually to within the same building or within a short distance from the base station.

Base station
Base stations include a radio transceiver which enables full-duplex, outgoing and incoming signals and speech with the handsets.  The base station often includes a microphone, audio amplifier, and a loudspeaker to enable hands-free speakerphone conversations, without needing to use a handset. The base station may also have a numeric keypad for dialing, and a display for caller ID. In addition, answering machine function may be built in. 

The cordless handset contains a rechargeable battery, which the base station recharges when the handset rests in its cradle. Muilt-handset systems generally also have additional charging stands.  A cordless telephone typically requires a constant electricity supply to power the base station and charger units by means of a DC transformer which plugs into a wall AC power outlet.

Mobile phones

A mobile phone or cellphone or hand phone is a handheld telephone which connects via radio transmissions to a cellular telephone network.  The cellular network consists of a network of ground based transmitter/receiver stations with antennas – which are usually located on towers or on buildings – and infrastructure connecting to land-based telephone lines.  Analog cellular networks first appeared in 1979, with the first digital cellular networks appearing in the early 1990s.

Mobile phones require a SIM card to be inserted into the phone.  The SIM card is a small PVC card containing a small integrated circuit which stores the user's international mobile subscriber identity (IMSI) number and its related key, which are used to identify and authenticate subscribers to the cellular network.

Mobile phones generally incorporate an LCD or OLED display, with some types, such as smartphones, having touch screens.  Since the 1990s, mobile phones have gained other features which are not directly related to their primary function as telephones.  These include text messaging, calendars, alarm clocks, personal schedulers, cameras, music players, games and later, internet access and smartphone functionality.  Nearly all mobile phones have the ability to send text messages to other users via the SMS (Short Message Service) protocol.  The multimedia messaging service (MMS) protocol enables users to send and receive multimedia content, such as photos, audio files and video files.  As their functionality has increased over the years, many types of mobile phone, notably smartphones, require an operating system to run.  Popular mobile phone operating systems in the past have included Symbian, Palm OS, BlackBerry OS and  mobile phone versions of Windows.  As of 2022, the most used operating systems are Google's Android and Apple's iOS.

Before the era of smartphones, mobile phones were generally manufactured by companies specializing in telecommunications equipment, such as Nokia, Motorola, and Ericsson.  Since the advent of smartphones, mobile phone manufacturers have also included consumer electronics companies, such as Apple, Samsung and Xiaomi.

Mobile phone usage
In 2002, only 10% of the world's population used mobile phones and by 2005 that percentage had risen to 46%. By the end of 2009, there were a total of nearly 6 billion mobile and fixed-line telephone subscribers worldwide. This included 1.26 billion fixed-line subscribers and 4.6 billion mobile subscribers.

Smartphones

As of 2022, most mobile phones are smartphones, being a combination of a mobile phone and a personal computing device in the same unit.  Most smartphones are primarily operated using a graphical user interface and a touch screen.  Many phones have a secondary voice user interface, such as Siri on Apple iPhones, which can operate many of the device's functions, as well as enabling users to use spoken commands to interact with the internet.  Typically alphanumeric text input is accomplished via an on-screen virtual keyboard, although some smartphones have a small physical keyboard.  Smartphones offer the ability to access internet data through the cellular network and via wi-fi, and usually allow direct connectivity to other devices via Bluetooth or a wired interface, such as USB or Lightning connectors.  Smartphones, being able to run apps, have vastly expanded functionality compared to previous mobile phones.  Having internet access and built in cameras, smartphones have made video calling readily accessible via IP connections.  Smartphones also have access to a large number of web services and web apps, giving them functionality similar to traditional computers, although smartphones are often limited by their relatively small screen size and the size of their keyboards.  Typically, smartphones feature such tools as cameras, media players, web browsers, email clients, interactive maps, satellite navigation and a variety of sensors, such as a compass, accelerometers and GPS receivers.  In addition to voice calls, smartphone users commonly communicate using a wide variety of messaging formats, including SMS, MMS, email, and various proprietary messaging services, such as iMessage and various social media platforms.

Satellite phones 

A satellite telephone, or satphone, is a type of mobile phone that connects to other phones or the telephone network by radio link through satellites orbiting the Earth instead of terrestrial cell sites, as cellphones do. Therefore, they can work in most geographic locations on the Earth's surface, as long as open sky and the line-of-sight between the phone and the satellite is provided. Depending on the architecture of a particular system, coverage may include the entire Earth or only specific regions. Satellite phones provide similar functionality to terrestrial mobile telephones; voice calling, text messaging, and low-bandwidth Internet access are supported through most systems. The advantage of a satellite phone is that it can be used in such regions where local terrestrial communication infrastructures, such as landline and cellular networks, are not available.   

Satellite phones are popular on expeditions into remote locations, hunting, fishing, maritime sector, humanitarian missions, business trips, and mining in hard-to-reach areas, where there is no reliable cellular service. Satellite telephones rarely get disrupted by natural disasters on Earth or human actions such as war, so they have proven to be dependable communication tools in emergency situations, when the local communications system can be compromised.

See also 

 Bell System
 Bell Telephone Memorial
 Cellular network
 Cordless telephone
 Harvard sentences
 Index of telephone-related articles
 Jipp curve
 List of telephone operating companies
 Mobile operating system
 Multimedia messaging service (MMS)
 Party line (telephony)
 Phone hacking
 Radiotelephone
 Satellite phone
 SIM card
 Spamming
 Telephone keypad
 Telephone jack and plug
 Telephone tapping
 Tip and ring
 Videophone

References

Further reading 
 Brooks, John (1976). Telephone: The first hundred years. HarperCollins.
 
 Casson, Herbert Newton. (1910) The history of the telephone  online.
 Coe, Lewis (1995). The Telephone and Its Several Inventors: A History. Jefferson, NC: McFarland & Co.
 Evenson, A. Edward (2000). The Telephone Patent Conspiracy of 1876: The Elisha Gray – Alexander Bell Controversy. Jefferson, NC: McFarland & Co.
 Fischer, Claude S. (1994) America calling: A social history of the telephone to 1940 (Univ of California Press, 1994)
 Huurdeman, Anton A. (2003). The Worldwide History of Telecommunications Hoboken: NJ: Wiley-IEEE Press.
 John, Richard R. (2010). Network Nation: Inventing American Telecommunications. Cambridge, MA: Harvard University Press.
 MacDougall, Robert. The People's Network: The Political Economy of the Telephone in the Gilded Age. Philadelphia: University of Pennsylvania Press.
 Mueller, Milton. (1993) "Universal service in telephone history: A reconstruction." Telecommunications Policy 17.5 (1993): 352–69.
 Todd, Kenneth P. (1998), A Capsule History of the Bell System. American Telephone & Telegraph Company (AT&T).

External links 

 Early U.S. Telephone Industry Data
 
 
 Virtual museum of early telephones
 The Telephone, 1877
 
 
 
 
 
 —Telegraphy (Bell's first telephone patent)—Alexander Graham Bell
 US 186,787—Electric Telegraphy (permanent magnet receiver)—Alexander Graham Bell
 US 474,230—Speaking Telegraph (graphite transmitter)—Thomas Edison
 US 203,016—Speaking Telephone (carbon button transmitter)—Thomas Edison
 US 222,390—Carbon Telephone (carbon granules transmitter)—Thomas Edison
 US 485,311—Telephone (solid back carbon transmitter)—Anthony C. White (Bell engineer) This design was used until 1925 and installed phones were used until the 1940s.
 US 3,449,750—Duplex Radio Communication and Signalling Apparatus—G. H. Sweigert
 US 3,663,762—Cellular Mobile Communication System—Amos Edward Joel (Bell Labs)
 US 3,906,166—Radio Telephone System (DynaTAC cell phone)—Martin Cooper et al. (Motorola)

1876 introductions
American inventions
Canadian inventions
Discovery and invention controversies
German inventions
Scottish inventions
Office equipment
Telecommunications equipment
 
Articles containing video clips
Home appliances
19th-century inventions